Xanthotryxus melanurus is a species of cluster fly in the family Polleniidae.

Distribution
China.

References

Polleniidae
Insects described in 1992
Diptera of Asia